Cushendun is a small coastal village in County Antrim, Northern Ireland. It sits off the A2 coast road between Cushendall and Ballycastle. It has a sheltered harbour and lies at the mouth of the River Dun and Glendun, one of the nine Glens of Antrim. The Mull of Kintyre in Scotland is only about 15 miles away across the North Channel and can be seen easily on clear days. In the 2001 Census it had a population of 138 people. It is part of Causeway Coast and Glens district.

The hamlet of Knocknacarry is nearby.

History

Cushendun is where Shane O'Neill, chief of the Tyrone O'Neill dynasty, was killed by the MacDonnells in 1567.

Cushendun village was designed for Ronald McNeill, the Conservative MP and author, later Lord Cushendun, in the style of a Cornish village by the architect Clough Williams-Ellis. He is buried in the Church of Ireland graveyard near his nationalist cousin Ada or Ide McNeill, Roger Casement's friend and admirer who died in 1959.

The National Trust has owned and cared for most of the village and the parkland around Glenmona House since 1954. Cushendun was designated as a conservation area in 1980, due to its architectural history and location within the Antrim Coast and Glens Area of Outstanding Natural Beauty.

People
Poet Moira O'Neill's home was across the bay from Cushendun at Rockport Lodge. She was the mother of Molly Keane, the noted Irish writer.

Robert Emmets GAC
In 1904 Dominic Quinn, Daniel Black and Willie McLaughlin founded the first Gaelic Athletic Association (GAA) club in Cushendun known as the Brian Boru's. The club participated in the first Feis-na-nGleann in 1904 and, after defeating Glenarm, lost to Carey in the final of the “Shield of Heroes”. In 2004 the club celebrated its centenary in a large marquee located in the grounds of Glenmona House. Nicky Brennan (then president of the GAA) and other GAA dignitaries from throughout Ireland joined in the celebrations.

During most of their existence Cushendun has been a junior hurling club but on a few occasions has moved up to the senior ranks. The club played Gaelic football in 1934 and 1972 but history and tradition in a small parish meant that the game was never popular and it failed to flourish for any significant period of time. The pinnacle of the club's achievements has been the winning of the All County Senior Championship in 1931. Since that date the Intermediate Championship has been won on three occasions-1973, 1992 and 2007. The Junior Championship was also secured in 1963 and again in 2018, along with several Feis competitions and leagues. Camogie has been played with a fair degree of success during several periods throughout the past century but has always been difficult to maintain.

One of the major highlights of the club's history was the construction of the new pitch in 1967/68 followed by the building of the new pavilion which was officially opened by then president of the GAA Jack Boothman in 1995. A second floodlit pitch was added to the complex at Lig-na-Arigid Park in 1999.

Media
The nearby caves of Cushendun have been used as backdrop in the TV series Game of Thrones.

References

External links 
Cushendun website
Cushendun information
http://www.cushendungac.com/

Villages in County Antrim
Planned communities in Northern Ireland